Lost Songs of 1936 is a jazz trio album led by Bucky Pizzarelli, released in 2006. The album showcases songs selected from the year 1936 in jazz history.

Track listing
 "Stompin at the Savoy"11:13
 "I'm Gonna Sit Right Down and Write Myself a Letter"4:36
 "The Night Is Young"3:29
 "All My Life"6:12
 "Goodnight My Love"3:41
 "The Panic Is On"3:51
 "Gloomy Sunday"3:13
 "Christopher Columbus"5:55
 "King of Swing"3:04
 "The Milkman's Matinee/Make Believe Ballroom"4:44
 "Did I Remember"5:20
 "The Touch of Your Lips"4:31
 "Quiet Night"2:48
 "Last Night When We Were Young"1:48
 "Pick Yourself Up"3:53

Personnel
Bucky Pizzarelliguitar, leader
Dick Hymanpiano
Jay Leonhartdouble bass

2006 albums
Bucky Pizzarelli albums
Swing albums